Oscar Tschirky (1866 – November 6, 1950) was a Swiss-American restaurateur who was maître d'hôtel of Delmonico's Restaurant and subsequently the Waldorf-Astoria Hotel in Manhattan, New York, United States. He was widely known as "Oscar of the Waldorf" and published a large cookbook.

Early life and education
Oscar Tschirky was born in 1866 in La Chaux-de-Fonds, Switzerland. He left for the United States in 1883, settling in New York City.

Career
Working first as a busboy, or commis waiter, in the Hoffman House shortly after his arrival in New York, he participated in the rise of exclusive restaurants. He became known as maître d'hôtel of Delmonico's Restaurant and subsequently the Waldorf-Astoria Hotel in Manhattan, New York. He was widely known as "Oscar of the Waldorf".

Because of his association with the restaurant, he capitalized on his association with food, although he had never worked as a chef. He published a large cookbook. He is also pictured on a relish bottle displayed in the lobby of the Waldorf-Astoria, along with other photos of him at the major events during his tenure as maître d'hôtel. He is credited with having created the Waldorf salad, and for aiding in the popularization of the Thousand Island dressing. Tschirky is also credited with developing the preparation of Eggs Benedict, although differing accounts make this hard to confirm.

Tschirky had a farm in New Paltz, New York, where he hosted picnics for friends and family as well as other chefs.  In later years the property was purchased by the Philantropique Society and was operated as a retirement home for chefs. It later opened to the general public and was known as The Culinarians' Home.

Cornell University holds the Oscar Tschirky papers and his noted collection of menus (Cornell University School of Hotel Administration).  Karl Schriftgiesser's biography of Tshirky, Oscar of the Waldorf (1943), rather, reads much like an autobiography.  Most of Oscar Tschirky's recollections therein are devoted to the Waldorf-Astoria Hotel and its founder, George C. Boldt, and his wife, Louise Kehrer Boldt.

References

1866 births
1950 deaths
American food writers
American hoteliers
People from La Chaux-de-Fonds
People from New Paltz, New York
Waldorf Astoria New York
American restaurateurs
Swiss emigrants to the United States